Saverna   is a village in Kanepi Parish, Põlva County in southeastern Estonia.

Orienteer Maret Vaher (born 1973) was born in Saverna.

Gallery

References

Villages in Põlva County
Kreis Werro